Pig is a 2021 American drama film written and directed by Michael Sarnoski (in his feature directorial debut), from a story by Vanessa Block and Sarnoski. The film stars Nicolas Cage as a truffle-hunter who lives alone in the Oregon wilderness and must return to his past in Portland in search of his beloved foraging pig after she is kidnapped. It also stars Alex Wolff and Adam Arkin.

Pig was theatrically released in the United States on July 16, 2021, by Neon. The film received critical acclaim, with praise for its screenplay and Cage's performance. It won the Independent Spirit Award for Best First Screenplay and earned Cage a second nomination for the Critics' Choice Movie Award for Best Actor.

Plot 
Robin "Rob" Feld is a former Portland-based chef turned reclusive truffle-forager. Living in a cabin deep in the Oregon forests, he hunts for truffles with the help of his prized foraging pig. He sells the truffles to Amir, a young and inexperienced supplier of luxury ingredients to high-end restaurants. One night, Rob is attacked by unidentified assailants as they steal his pig. He reaches out to Amir, who helps him locate a group of impoverished drug-addicts suspected by another local truffle-hunter of being the culprits. They claim to have given the pig to someone from downtown Portland.

Rob and Amir drive to Portland and infiltrate an underground fighting ring run by Edgar, an old acquaintance of Rob's, who provides another clue on the whereabouts of his pig. The following morning, Amir voices his admiration for Rob as a chef. Amir reveals that his parents had an unhappy marriage and says their happiest time was after a dinner at Rob's restaurant, before his mother eventually died by suicide. Following Edgar's lead, Rob asks Amir to secure reservations for themselves at Eurydice, a trendy haute cuisine restaurant. In the meantime, Rob visits the house where he used to live with his wife Lori, whose death compelled Rob to withdraw from society.

At Eurydice, Rob asks to meet with its head chef, Derek, a former prep cook at Rob's restaurant. Rob pointedly, yet empathetically criticizes Derek for opening a contemporary restaurant rather than the pub he always wanted to run. Overwhelmed by the memory of his dream and the reality of his current circumstances, Derek confesses that Amir's wealthy father, Darius, was behind the theft of his pig, having learned of its existence from Amir. Rob angrily ends his partnership with Amir before going to confront Darius at his home. Darius promises him $25,000 in exchange for the pig and threatens to kill it should Rob continue his pursuit. Amir visits his comatose mother in a care facility, revealing she is still alive. He goes to Darius' home to offer Rob a ride, who admits that he does not need his pig to hunt truffles (since he uses the trees), but wants her back because he loves her. He asks Amir to gather a list of items in order to retrieve his pig through different tactics.

As Rob retrieves a baguette from his former baker, Amir sources special ingredients, including a bottle of wine from Rob and Lori's personal collection, held at the mausoleum containing Lori's ashes. After sneaking back into Darius's house, Rob and Amir cook and serve dinner to Darius, the same dish and wine pairing that Rob prepared for Darius and his wife years earlier at his restaurant. An emotional Darius leaves the table. When Rob follows him, Darius confesses that the junkies he hired for the theft had mishandled the pig, resulting in her death. Rob is devastated. A remorseful Amir drives him back to a diner near his forest home. Despite Amir's carelessness, Rob decides to resume his partnership with him. Returning to his forest, Rob washes his bloody face in the lake before returning to his cabin to play a tape that Lori recorded of herself singing Bruce Springsteen’s "I'm on Fire" to him for his birthday.

Cast
Nicolas Cage as Robin "Rob" Feld
Brandy The Pig as The Pig
Alex Wolff as Amir
Adam Arkin as Darius
Nina Belforte as Charlotte
Gretchen Corbett as Mac
David Knell as Chef Derek Finway
Beth Harper as Donna/Diner Waitress
Darius Pierce as Edgar
Cassandra Violet as Lorelai "Lori" Feld

Production
In September 2019, it was announced Nicolas Cage and Alex Wolff had joined the cast of the film, with Michael Sarnoski directing from a screenplay he wrote.

Principal photography began September 23, 2019, in Portland, Oregon, lasting 20 days.

Release
In March 2020, Neon acquired U.S. distribution rights to the film. Pig had a theatrical release in the United States on July 16, 2021. Followed by screenings in the UK and Republic of Ireland on August 20, 2021.

Reception

Box office
The film grossed $945,000 in 552 theaters in its first opening weekend. It additionally grossed $565,000 in its second weekend.

Critical response

Positive
 The site's critics consensus reads, "Like the animal itself, Pig defies the hogwash of expectations with a beautiful odyssey of loss and love anchored by Nicolas Cage's affectingly raw performance." On Metacritic, the film has a weighted average score of 82 out of 100, based on 39 critics, indicating "universal acclaim".

Richard Roeper of the Chicago Sun-Times gave the film a score of four out of four stars, writing: "The unpredictable Cage delivers some of his best work in years." Bilge Ebiri of Vulture gave the film a positive review and stated, "As it proceeds, it expands its vision and compassion, even as it de-escalates the tension. It's not about the thing it's about, except that it ultimately is totally about the thing it's about." Richard Whittaker of The Austin Chronicle gave the film four-and-a-half out of five stars and stated, "At a time when so many people are struggling to find something of value in their lives, when people are fleeing jobs, cities, futures they thought they wanted, Cage has crafted a quiet soliloquy about grasping onto something that has meaning." Thelma Adams of AARP Movies for Grownups gave the film four out of five stars and stated, "Playing oddly against expectations, there's no Cage Rage, no showy violence or operatic monologues, just a simple, moving story of a broken man who lost his pig but, perhaps, has found his way." Johnny Oleksinski of The New York Post gave the film three out of four stars, calling it "[an] undeniably odd, but surprisingly touching drama."

Karen Han of Slate gave the film a positive review and stated, "Pig is a small film with a few big surprises executed very well, and well worth going into as blind as possible." Mike D'Angelo of The A.V. Club gave the film a grade of "A", writing that "There are no plot twists, in the traditional sense, but each successive encounter reveals a new facet that enriches the tale." Carlos Aguilar of TheWrap gave the film a positive review, writing, "Not all the ingredients make sense together, but the product of their intermingling inside the filmmaker's narrative pot render a special concoction." Noel Murray, in his review of the film for the Los Angeles Times, wrote that, "Though its plot follows the same rough outline of a John Wick-style shoot-em-up, Pig is actually a quiet and often melancholy meditation on loss, anchored by a character who wishes he could shake free of the person he used to be." Kristy Puchko, in her review of the film for Pajiba, wrote: "Pig is not only a mesmerizing while meditative drama about love and loss. It is also a powerful reminder that Cage is one of the most talented, most captivating movie stars of our time." Cody Corrall of the Chicago Reader gave the film a positive review and stated, "Even through its various webs of tragedy, relentless ambition, and destruction for capital gain—Pig remarkably and overwhelmingly champions care and kindness." Randy Myers of The Mercury News gave the film three-and-a-half out of four stars and stated, "It is Cage who carries Pig with a measured performance in which his trademark outbursts pierce the soul. He's magnificent."

Jeannette Catsoulis of The New York Times gave the film a positive review, writing that, "While Pig can at times feel engulfed by its own sullenness, there's a rigor to the filmmaking and a surreal beauty to Pat Scola's images that seal our investment in Robin's fate." Matt Zoller Seitz of RogerEbert.com gave the film four out of four stars, and wrote: "What a beguiling, confounding film Pig is. From start to finish, it never moves as you might expect it to." Michael O'Sullivan of The Washington Post also gave the film four out of four stars, writing that "Pig's stock in trade is a kind of visual and narrative poetry, and Sarnoski and Block ply it with the skill and light touch of master chefs." The Guardians Benjamin Lee gave the film three out of five stars and stated, "It... hints at exciting things to come from Sarnoski, a gifted visual filmmaker, who has assembled a promising, if imperfect, debut." Sheri Linden of The Hollywood Reporter gave the film a positive review, writing: "Whatever the screenplay's stumbles, Cage's contained performance embraces his character's losses and his turning away from the world without the slightest play for sympathy." Chuck Bowen of Slant Magazine gave the film three out of four stars and stated, "Nicolas Cage, in full martyr mode here, seems to get off on the perversity of, well, caging his brand of operatic hysteria." Michael Nordine of Variety gave the film a positive review, concluding that, "As a descent into the apparently high-stakes world of truffle-pig-poaching, Pig is unexpectedly touching; as a showcase for Cage's brilliance, it's a revelation." Lauren Milici of Total Film praised the film, writing: "Blood and weapons aside, the film is a moving meditation on grief and loss, and how sometimes the only way to move on is to return to the place that broke us in the first place."

Ethan Brehm of SPOILER Magazine named it the best film of the year.

Cage has stated that Pig is his favorite film that he has starred in to date, and considers it his best performance.

Negative
Gary M. Kramer, in a negative review of the film for Salon.com, wrote that "Pig doesn't give viewers much to care about, other than perhaps the title character. Sarnoski's film is undercooked."

Accolades

References

External links
 
 
 

2021 films
2021 directorial debut films
2021 drama films
2021 thriller drama films
2020s English-language films
American thriller drama films
Films about animal rights
Films about chefs
Films set in Portland, Oregon
Films shot in Portland, Oregon
Films produced by Nicolas Cage
2021 independent films
Neon (distributor) films
2020s American films